Ion Reactor, is an invention by a British scientist.

History
In 2011, Dr Christopher Strevens (an inventor from London) began posting a website with instructions of how to build his "fusion reactor", which he says: "Creates helium from hydrogen. It also captures the power given off during the reaction as electrical power." He also posted several videos to YouTube showing his prototype in operation, and showing the different color of gas from before versus after; as well as showing spectral analysis that indicates that the hydrogen that he puts into the system has transmuted to helium—a nuclear phenomenon.

He said: "I found that when I increased the exciter power to 800 Watts, the output rose to 2,000 Watts [2.5-times overunity], and when I isolated the reactor from the exciter, this power remained. The spark gap regulator became active, keeping the power at this level. I only allowed this for a short time before reconnecting the exciter and turning the power down and the reaction ceased."

Because of the experiment being dangerous it would require a special paramagnetic ceramic bottle glazed inside to contain hydrogen ions and use the magnetic field of the coils and induction of ion fields to make a magnetic bottle to confine the ion reactions.

A brief description of the device, being a hydrogen tube wrapped with high voltage coils and a sort of energizing coil being similar to a high voltage tesla coil for the ionizer. The device having been made in a clear glass tube in early experiments uses induction to ionize the gases and the field made by ionized gases to energize ion tube coils.

The effect is similar to pyroelectric fusion but instead of pyroelectric crystals stripping the electrons from hydrogen atoms it is a high voltage induced electromagnetic field of coils and electrostatic induction of the ionized gas.

References

https://ntrs.nasa.gov/archive/nasa/casi.ntrs.nasa.gov/19660030642.pdf

External links
 Ionization: **http://www.britannica.com/science/ionization
 Pyroelectric fusion
LC tank Circuit: http://www.circuitstoday.com/basic-oscillatory-circuits
Plasma Physics: 
Cold Fusion

Cold fusion